Mount Duval, a large forested mountain of the New England Range, part of the Great Dividing Range, is located on the Northern Tablelands in the New England region of New South Wales, Australia.

Mount Duval features on the logo of the Armidale Dumaresq Council.

The mountain was named after John Duval, a convict and servant of a local pastoralist who worked in the area around the mountain in the 1830s. Most of the mountain is contained within the Duval Nature Reserve. Duval College at the University of New England is also named after the mountain.

Little Mount Duval

When viewed from Armidale, Little Mount Duval appears much smaller and was so named accordingly. On the summit of Little Mount Duval sit the transmission relay towers for a number of radio and television stations that broadcast into Armidale.

See also 
 
List of mountains in New South Wales

References

Duval
Mount Duval
Northern Tablelands